The 2000 Rio de Janeiro motorcycle Grand Prix was the fourteenth round of the 2000 Grand Prix motorcycle racing season. It took place on 7 October 2000 at the Autódromo Internacional Nelson Piquet.
Kenny Roberts Jr sealed the world title at this race by finishing in 6th place and Suzuki's last world title until 20 years later with Joan Mir.

500 cc classification

250 cc classification

125 cc classification

Championship standings after the race (500cc)

Below are the standings for the top five riders and constructors after round fourteen has concluded. 

Riders' Championship standings

Constructors' Championship standings

 Note: Only the top five positions are included for both sets of standings.

References

Rio de Janeiro motorcycle Grand Prix
Rio de Janeiro
Rio de Janeiro Grand Prix